Valerie Lafon-Gotay (born November 5, 1973 in San Diego, California) is a former judoka from the United States.

Biography
Gotay was born in San Diego. Her grandfather Piere Lafon and father Gerald Lafon are former judoplayers so she had good background for judo from youth. She began competing at age of 14.

At 18 years old, Gotay was supposed to compete in the 1992 Olympic Games in extra-lightweight category. Unfortunately, after working hard to lose some kilos to make her weight category, she became extremely sick with uncontrollable and violent muscle contractions which forced her to withdraw from the competition.

She decided to stop competing after Barcelona.

Gotay later married and has two children Breanna (1996) and Isabella (2001).

In 2004, she came out of retirement. "I missed the training," Gotay said. "I'm a pretty intense person. I love training. I missed training for something, having a goal and working toward it. I came back not even knowing I was coming back."

She was invited to compete in the British Open and in 2007 was part of the United States team at the Pan American Games.

Judo
At the 2008 Olympic Games in Beijing, she was eliminated in the second round by Isabel Fernández from Spain. Gotay went to Beijing with big (medal) ambitions, but it was not a very good tournament for her. She had already had problems in first round with Gulzat Uralbayeva from Kazakhstan. With three minutes left, she got a second chance,  because the Kazakh judoka scored only wazaari, rather than ippon. After this score, the young Kazakh judoka became very passive. Gotay took advantage of this passivity and won by ippon with one minute remaining.

Achievements

References

External links
 
 Sport-Reference
 USA Judo
 Facebook

1973 births
Living people
American female judoka
Pan American Games silver medalists for the United States
Pan American Games medalists in judo
Judoka at the 2007 Pan American Games
Medalists at the 2007 Pan American Games
21st-century American women